Pierrot is a stock character of pantomime and commedia dell'arte, whose origins are in the late seventeenth-century Italian troupe of players performing in Paris and known as the Comédie-Italienne. The name is a diminutive of Pierre (Peter), via the suffix -ot. His character in contemporary popular culture — in poetry, fiction, and the visual arts, as well as works for the stage, screen, and concert hall — is that of the sad clown, often pining for love of Columbine, who usually breaks his heart and leaves him for Harlequin. Performing unmasked, with a whitened face, he wears a loose white blouse with large buttons and wide white pantaloons. Sometimes he appears with a frilled collaret and a hat, usually with a close-fitting crown and wide round brim and, more rarely, with a conical shape like a dunce's cap.

Pierrot's character developed from being a buffoon to an avatar of the disenfranchised. Many cultural movements found him amenable to their respective causes: Decadents turned him into a disillusioned foe of idealism; Symbolists saw him as a lonely fellow-sufferer; Modernists made him into a silent, alienated observer of the mysteries of the human condition. Much of that mythic quality ("I'm Pierrot," said David Bowie: "I'm Everyman") still adheres to the "sad clown" in the postmodern era.

Origins: seventeenth century

Pierrot is sometimes said to be a French variant of the sixteenth-century Italian Pedrolino, but the two types have little but their names ("Little Pete") and social stations in common. Both are comic servants, but Pedrolino, as a so-called first zanni, often acts with cunning and daring, an engine of the plot in the scenarios where he appears. Pierrot, on the other hand, as a "second" zanni, stands "on the periphery of the action." He dispenses advice and courts his master's young daughter, Columbine, bashfully.

His origins among the Italian players in France go back to Molière's peasant Pierrot in Don Juan, or The Stone Guest (1665). In 1673, the Comédie-Italienne made its own contribution to the Don Juan legend with an Addendum to "The Stone Guest", which included Molière's Pierrot. Thereafter the character—sometimes a peasant, but more often now an Italianate "second" zanni—appeared fairly regularly in the Italians' offerings, his role always taken by one Giuseppe Giaratone (or Geratoni, fl. 1639-1697).

Among the French dramatists writing roles for Pierrot were Jean de Palaprat, Claude-Ignace Brugière de Barante, Antoine Houdar de la Motte, and Jean-François Regnard. They present him as an anomaly among busy social personalities around him. Columbine laughs at his advances; his masters who are in pursuit of pretty young wives brush off his warnings to act their age. His isolation bears the pathos of Watteau's portraits.

Eighteenth century

France

An Italian company was called back to Paris in 1716, and Pierrot was reincarnated by the actors Pierre-François Biancolelli (son of the Harlequin of the banished troupe of players) and, after Biancolelli abandoned the role, the celebrated Fabio Sticotti (1676–1741) and his son Antoine Jean (1715–1772). But the character seems to have been regarded as unimportant by this company, since he appears infrequently in its new plays.

The character appeared often in the eighteenth century on Parisian stages. Sometimes he spoke gibberish, sometimes the audience itself sang his lines, inscribed on placards held aloft. He could appear as a valet, a cook, or an adventurer; his character is not strictly defined."

In the 1720s, Pierrot came into his own. In plays like Trophonius's Cave (1722) and The Golden Ass (1725), one meets an engaging Pierrot. The accomplished comic actor Jean-Baptiste Hamoche portrayed him with success.  After 1733, he rarely appears in new plays.

Pierrot also appeared in the visual arts and in folksongs ("Au clair de la lune"). The art of Claude Gillot (Master André's Tomb [c. 1717]), of Gillot's students Watteau (Italian Actors [c. 1719]) and Nicolas Lancret (Italian Actors near a Fountain [c. 1719]), of Jean-Baptiste Oudry (Italian Actors in a Park [c. 1725]), of Philippe Mercier (Pierrot and Harlequin [n.d.]), and of Jean-Honoré Fragonard (A Boy as Pierrot [1776–1780]) features him prominently.

England
As early as 1673, just months after Pierrot had made his debut in the Addendum to "The Stone Guest", Scaramouche Tiberio Fiorilli and a troupe assembled from the Comédie-Italienne entertained Londoners with selections from their Parisian repertoire. And in 1717, Pierrot's name first appears in an English entertainment: a pantomime by John Rich entitled The Jealous Doctor; or, The Intriguing Dame. Thereafter, until the end of the century, Pierrot appeared fairly regularly in English pantomimes (which were originally mute harlequinades; in the nineteenth century, the harlequinade was a "play within a play" during the pantomime), finding his most notable interpreter in Carlo Delpini (1740–1828). Delpini, according to the popular-theater historian, M. Willson Disher, "kept strictly to the idea of a creature so stupid as to think that if he raised his leg level with his shoulder he could use it as a gun." Pierrot was later displaced by the English clown.

Denmark
In 1800, a troupe of Italian players led by Pasquale Casorti performed in Dyrehavsbakken. Casorti's son, Giuseppe (1749–1826), began appearing as Pierrot in pantomimes, which now had a formulaic plot structure. Pierrot is still a fixture at Bakken, at nearby Tivoli Gardens and Tivoli Friheden in Aarhus.

Germany
Ludwig Tieck's The Topsy-Turvy World (1798) is an early—and highly successful—example of the introduction of the commedia dell'arte characters into parodic metatheater. (Pierrot is a member of the audience watching the play.)

Spain
The penetration of Pierrot and his companions of the commedia into Spain is documented in a painting by Goya, Itinerant Actors (1793). It foreshadows the work of such Spanish successors as Picasso and Fernand Pelez, both of whom also showed strong sympathy with the lives of traveling saltimbancos.

Nineteenth century

Pantomime of Deburau at the Théâtre des Funambules
The Théâtre des Funambules was a little theater licensed in its early years to present only mimed and acrobatic acts. It was the home, beginning in 1816, of Jean-Gaspard Deburau (1796–1846), the most famous Pierrot ever. He was immortalized by Jean-Louis Barrault in Marcel Carné's film Children of Paradise (1945).

Deburau, from the year 1825, was the only actor at the Funambules to play Pierrot, and he did so in several types of pantomime: rustic, melodramatic, "realistic", and fantastic.  His style, according to Louis Péricaud, formed "an enormous contrast with the exuberance, the superabundance of gestures, of leaps, that ... his predecessors had employed." He altered the costume: he dispensed with the frilled collaret, substituted a skullcap for a hat, and greatly increased the wide cut of both blouse and trousers. Deburau's Pierrot avoided the crude Pierrots—timid, sexless, lazy, and greedy— found in earlier pantomime.

The Funambules Pierrot appealed to audiences in the faery-tale style which incorporoate the commedia types. The plot often hinged on Cassander's pursuit of Harlequin and Columbine, having to deal with a clever and ambiguous Pierrot. Deburau early—about 1828—caught the attention of the Romantics. In 1842, Théophile Gautier published a fake review of a "Shakespeare" pantomime he claimed to have seen at the Funambules. It placed Pierrot in the company of over-reachers in high literature like Don Juan or Macbeth.

Pantomime after Baptiste: Charles Deburau, Paul Legrand, and their successors

Deburau's son, Jean-Charles (or, as he preferred, "Charles" [1829–1873]), assumed Pierrot's blouse the year after his father died. Another important Pierrot of mid-century was Charles-Dominique-Martin Legrand, known as Paul Legrand (1816–1898; see photo at top of page). He began appearing at the Funambules as Pierrot in 1845. 
Legrand left the Funambules in 1853 for the Folies-Nouvelles, which attracted the fashionable set, unlike the Funambules' working-class audiences. Legrand often appeared in realistic costume, his chalky face his only concession to tradition, leading some advocates of pantomime, like Gautier, to lament that he was betraying the character of the type. Legrand's Pierrot influenced future mimes.

Pantomime and late nineteenth-century art

France
Popular and literary pantomime

In the 1880s and 1890s, the pantomime reached a kind of apogee, and Pierrot became ubiquitous. Moreover, he acquired a female counterpart, Pierrette, who rivaled Columbine for his affections. A Cercle Funambulesque was founded in 1888, and Pierrot (sometimes played by female mimes, such as Félicia Mallet) dominated its productions until its demise in 1898. Sarah Bernhardt even donned Pierrot's blouse for Jean Richepin's Pierrot the Murderer (1883).

But French mimes and actors were not the only figures responsible for Pierrot's ubiquity: the English Hanlon brothers (sometimes called the Hanlon-Lees), gymnasts and acrobats who had been schooled in the 1860s in pantomimes from Baptiste's repertoire, traveled (and dazzled) the world well into the twentieth century with their pantomimic sketches and extravaganzas featuring riotously nightmarish Pierrots. The Naturalists—Émile Zola especially, who wrote glowingly of them—were captivated by their art. Edmond de Goncourt modeled his acrobat-mimes in his The Zemganno Brothers (1879) upon them; J.-K. Huysmans (whose Against Nature [1884] would become Dorian Gray's bible) and his friend Léon Hennique wrote their pantomime Pierrot the Skeptic (1881) after seeing them perform at the Folies Bergère. (And, in turn, Jules Laforgue wrote his pantomime Pierrot the Cut-Up [Pierrot fumiste, 1882] after reading the scenario by Huysmans and Hennique.) It was in part through the enthusiasm that they excited, coupled with the Impressionists' taste for popular entertainment, like the circus and the music-hall, as well as the new bohemianism that then reigned in artistic quarters like Montmartre (and which was celebrated by such denizens as Adolphe Willette, whose cartoons and canvases are crowded with Pierrots)—it was through all this that Pierrot achieved almost unprecedented currency and visibility towards the end of the century.
Visual arts, fiction, poetry, music, and film
He invaded the visual arts—not only in the work of Willette, but also in the illustrations and posters of Jules Chéret; in the engravings of Odilon Redon (The Swamp Flower: A Sad Human Head [1885]); and in the canvases of Georges Seurat (Pierrot with a White Pipe [Aman-Jean] [1883]; The Painter Aman-Jean as Pierrot [1883]), Léon Comerre (Pierrot [1884], Pierrot Playing the Mandolin [1884]), Henri Rousseau (A Carnival Night [1886]), Paul Cézanne (Mardi gras [Pierrot and Harlequin] [1888]), Fernand Pelez (Grimaces and Miseries a.k.a. The Saltimbanques [1888]), Pablo Picasso (Pierrot and Columbine [1900]), Guillaume Seignac (Pierrot's Embrace [1900]),   Théophile Steinlen (Pierrot and the Cat [1889]), and Édouard Vuillard (The Black Pierrot [c. 1890]). The mime "Tombre" of Jean Richepin's novel Nice People (Braves Gens [1886]) turned him into a pathetic and alcoholic "phantom"; Paul Verlaine imagined him as a gormandizing naïf in "Pantomime" (1869), then, like Tombre, as a lightning-lit specter in "Pierrot" (1868, pub. 1882). Laforgue put three of the "complaints" of his first published volume of poems (1885) into "Lord" Pierrot's mouth—and dedicated his next book, The Imitation of Our Lady the Moon (1886), completely to Pierrot and his world. (Pierrots were legion among the minor, now-forgotten poets: for samples, see Willette's journal The Pierrot, which appeared between 1888 and 1889, then again in 1891.) In the realm of song, Claude Debussy set both Verlaine's "Pantomime" and Banville's "Pierrot" (1842) to music in 1881 (not published until 1926)—the only precedents among works by major composers being the "Pierrot" section of Telemann's Burlesque Overture (1717–22), Mozart's 1783 "Masquerade" (in which Mozart himself took the role of Harlequin and his brother-in-law, Joseph Lange, that of Pierrot), and the "Pierrot" section of Robert Schumann's Carnival (1835). Even the embryonic art of the motion picture turned to Pierrot before the century was out: he appeared, not only in early celluloid shorts (Georges Méliès's The Nightmare [1896], The Magician [1898]; Alice Guy's Arrival of Pierrette and Pierrot [1900], Pierrette's Amorous Adventures [1900]; Ambroise-François Parnaland's Pierrot's Big Head/Pierrot's Tongue [1900], Pierrot-Drinker [1900]), but also in Emile Reynaud's Praxinoscope production of Poor Pierrot (1892), the first animated movie and the first hand-colored one.

Belgium
In Belgium, Félicien Rops depicted a grinning Pierrot who witnesses an unromantic backstage scene (Blowing Cupid's Nose [1881]). James Ensor painted Pierrots obsessively, in various poses from prostrate to bowing his head in despondency, sometimes even with a smiling skeleton. The Belgian poet and dramatist Albert Giraud also identified with the zanni: the fifty rondels of his Pierrot lunaire (Moonstruck Pierrot, 1884) inspired generations of composers (see Pierrot lunaire below), and his verse-play Pierrot-Narcissus (1887) offered a definitive portrait of the poet-dreamer. The choreographer Joseph Hansen staged the ballet Macabre Pierrot in 1884 in collaboration with the poet Théo Hannon.

England
Pierrot figured prominently in the drawings of Aubrey Beardsley, and various writers referenced him in their poetry. Ethel Wright painted Bonjour, Pierrot! (a greeting to a dour clown sitting disconsolate with his dog) in 1893. The Pierrot of popular taste also spawned a uniquely English entertainment. In 1891, the singer and banjoist Clifford Essex, resolved to create a troupe of English Pierrot entertainers, and called them the seaside Pierrots who, as late as the 1950s, performed on the piers of Brighton, Margate, and Blackpool. They inspired the Will Morris Pierrots, named after their Birmingham founder. They originated in the Smethwick area in the late 1890s and played to large audiences in the Midlands. Walter Westley Russell committed these performers to canvas in The Pierrots (c. 1900).

Pierrot's mask claimed the attention of the great theater innovator Edward Gordon Craig. Craig's involvement with the figure grew with time. In 1897, Craig, dressed as Pierrot, gave a quasi-impromptu stage-reading of Hans Christian Andersen's story "What the Moon Saw" as part of a benefit performance for theater artists in need.

Austria and Germany
Although he lamented that "the Pierrot figure was inherently alien to the German-speaking world", the playwright Franz Blei introduced him enthusiastically into his playlet The Kissy-Face: A Columbiade (1895), and his fellow-Austrians Richard Specht and Richard Beer-Hofmann made an effort to naturalize Pierrot—in their plays Pierrot-Hunchback (1896) and Pierrot-Hypnotist (1892, first pub. 1984), respectively—by linking his fortunes with those of Goethe's Faust.  Still others among their countrymen simply sidestepped the issue of naturalization: Hermann Bahr took his inspiration for his Pantomime of the Good Man (1893) directly from his encounter with the exclusively French Cercle Funambulesque; Rudolf Holzer set the action of his Puppet Loyalty (1899), unapologetically, in a fabulous Paris; and Karl Michael von Levetzow settled his Two Pierrots (1900) in the birthplace of Pierrot's comedy, Italy.

In Germany, Frank Wedekind introduced the femme-fatale of his first "Lulu" play, Earth Spirit (1895), in a Pierrot costume. In a similar spirit, the painter Paul Hoecker put cheeky young men into Pierrot costumes to ape their complacent burgher elders in Pierrots with Pipes (c. 1900) and swilling champagne in Waiting Woman (c. 1895).

Italy
Canio's Pagliaccio in the famous opera (1892) by Leoncavallo is close enough to a Pierrot to deserve a mention here. Much less well-known is the work of two other composers—Mario Pasquale Costa and Vittorio Monti.  Costa's pantomime L'Histoire d'un Pierrot (Story of a Pierrot), which debuted in Paris in 1893, was so admired in its day that it eventually reached audiences on several continents, was paired with Cavalleria Rusticana by New York's Metropolitan Opera Company in 1909, and was premiered as a film by Baldassarre Negroni in 1914.  Its libretto, like that of Monti's "mimodrama" Noël de Pierrot a.k.a. A Clown's Christmas (1900), was written by Fernand Beissier, one of the founders of the Cercle Funambulesque. (Monti would go on to acquire his own fame by celebrating another spiritual outsider much akin to Pierrot—the Gypsy. His Csárdás [c. 1904], like Pagliacci, has found a secure place in the standard musical repertoire.)

The portrait and genre painter Vittorio Matteo Corcos produced Portrait of Boy in Pierrot Costume in 1897.

Spain
In 1895, the playwright and future Nobel laureate Jacinto Benavente wrote rapturously in his journal of a performance of the Hanlon-Lees, and three years later he published his only pantomime: The Whiteness of Pierrot.  A true fin-de-siècle mask, Pierrot paints his face black to commit robbery and murder; then, after restoring his pallor, he hides himself, terrified of his own undoing, in a snowbank—forever.  Thus does he forfeit his union with Columbine (the intended beneficiary of his crimes) for a frosty marriage with the moon.

North America
Pierrot and his fellow masks were late in coming to the United States, which, unlike England, Russia, and the countries of continental Europe, had had no early exposure to commedia dell'arte. The Hanlon-Lees made their first U.S. appearance in 1858, and their subsequent tours, well into the twentieth century, of scores of cities throughout the country accustomed their audiences to their fantastic, acrobatic Pierrots. But the Pierrot that would leave the deepest imprint upon the American imagination was that of the French and English Decadents, a creature who quickly found his home in the so-called little magazines of the 1890s (as well as in the poster-art that they spawned). One of the earliest and most influential of these in America, The Chap-Book (1894–98), which featured a story about Pierrot by the aesthete Percival Pollard in its second number, was soon host to Beardsley-inspired Pierrots drawn by E.B. Bird and Frank Hazenplug. (The Canadian poet Bliss Carman should also be mentioned for his contribution to Pierrot's dissemination in mass-market publications like Harper's.) Like most things associated with the Decadence, such exotica discombobulated the mainstream American public, which regarded the little magazines in general as "freak periodicals" and declared, through one of its mouthpieces, Munsey's Magazine, that "each new representative of the species is, if possible, more preposterous than the last."  And yet the Pierrot of that species was gaining a foothold elsewhere.  The composers Amy Beach and Arthur Foote devoted a section to Pierrot (as well as to Pierrette, his Decadent counterpart) in two ludic pieces for piano—Beach's Children's Carnival (1894) and Foote's Five Bagatelles (1893).

The fin-de-siècle world in which this Pierrot resided was clearly at odds with the reigning American Realist and Naturalist aesthetic (though such figures as Ambrose Bierce and John LaFarge were mounting serious challenges to it). It is in fact jarring to find the champion of American prose Realism, William Dean Howells, introducing Pastels in Prose (1890), a volume of French prose-poems containing a Paul Margueritte pantomime, The Death of Pierrot, with words of warm praise (and even congratulations to each poet for failing "to saddle his reader with a moral"). So uncustomary was the French Aesthetic viewpoint that, when Pierrot made an appearance in Pierrot the Painter (1893), a pantomime by Alfred Thompson, set to music by the American composer Laura Sedgwick Collins, The New York Times covered it as an event, even though it was only a student production. It was found to be "pleasing" because, in part, it was "odd". Not until the first decade of the next century, when the great (and popular) fantasist Maxfield Parrish worked his magic on the figure, would Pierrot be comfortably naturalized in America.

Of course, writers from the United States living abroad—especially in Paris or London—were aberrantly susceptible to the charms of the Decadence.  Such a figure was Stuart Merrill, who consorted with the French Symbolists and who compiled and translated the pieces in Pastels in Prose.  Another was William Theodore Peters, an acquaintance of Ernest Dowson and other members of the Rhymers' Club and a driving force behind the conception and theatrical realization of Dowson's Pierrot of the Minute (1897; see England above).  Of the three books that Peters published before his death (of starvation) at the age of forty-two, his Posies out of Rings: And Other Conceits (1896) is most notable here: in it, four poems and an "Epilogue" for the aforementioned Dowson play are devoted to Pierrot.  (From the mouth of Pierrot loquitur: "Although this pantomime of life is passing fine,/Who would be happy must not marry Columbine".)

Another pocket of North-American sympathy with the Decadence—one manifestation of what the Latin world called modernismo—could be found in the progressive literary scene of Mexico, its parent country, Spain, having been long conversant with the commedia dell'arte.  In 1897, Bernardo Couto Castillo, another Decadent who, at the age of twenty-two, died even more tragically young than Peters, embarked on a series of Pierrot-themed short stories—"Pierrot Enamored of Glory" (1897), "Pierrot and His Cats" (1898), "The Nuptials of Pierrot" (1899), "Pierrot's Gesture" (1899), "The Caprices of Pierrot" (1900)—culminating, after the turn of the century (and in the year of Couto's death), with "Pierrot-Gravedigger" (1901).  For the Spanish-speaking world, according to scholar Emilio Peral Vega, Couto "expresses that first manifestation of Pierrot as an alter ego in a game of symbolic otherness ..."

Central and South America
Inspired by the French Symbolists, especially Verlaine, Rubén Darío, the Nicaraguan poet widely acknowledged as the founder of Spanish-American literary Modernism (modernismo), placed Pierrot ("sad poet and dreamer") in opposition to Columbine ("fatal woman", the arch-materialistic "lover of rich silk garments, golden jewelry, pearls and diamonds") in his 1898 prose-poem The Eternal Adventure of Pierrot and Columbine.

Russia
In the last year of the century, Pierrot appeared in a Russian ballet, Harlequin's Millions a.k.a. Harlequinade (1900), its libretto and choreography by Marius Petipa, its music by Riccardo Drigo, its dancers the members of St. Petersburg's Imperial Ballet. It would set the stage for the later and greater triumphs of Pierrot in the productions of the Ballets Russes.

Nineteenth-century legacy
The Pierrot bequeathed to the twentieth century had acquired a rich and wide range of personae. He was the naïve butt of practical jokes and amorous scheming (Gautier); the prankish but innocent waif (Banville, Verlaine, Willette); the narcissistic dreamer clutching at the moon, which could symbolize many things, from spiritual perfection to death (Giraud, Laforgue, Willette, Dowson); the frail, neurasthenic, often doom-ridden soul (Richepin, Beardsley); the clumsy, though ardent, lover, who wins Columbine's heart, or murders her in frustration (Margueritte); the cynical and misogynistic dandy, sometimes dressed in black (Huysmans/Hennique, Laforgue); the Christ-like victim of the martyrdom that is Art (Giraud, Willette, Ensor); the androgynous and unholy creature of corruption (Richepin, Wedekind); the madcap master of chaos (the Hanlon-Lees); the purveyor of hearty and wholesome fun (the English pier Pierrots)—and various combinations of these. Like the earlier masks of commedia dell'arte, Pierrot now knew no national boundaries. Thanks to the international gregariousness of Modernism, he would soon be found everywhere.

Pierrot and modernism
Pierrot played a seminal role in the emergence of Modernism in the arts.  He was a key figure in every art-form except architecture.

With respect to poetry, T. S. Eliot's "breakthrough work", "The Love Song of J. Alfred Prufrock" (1915), owed its existence to the poems of Jules Laforgue, whose "ton 'pierrot'" informed all of Eliot's early poetry.  (Laforgue, he said, "was the first to teach me how to speak, to teach me the poetic possibilities of my own idiom of speech.")  Prufrock is a Pierrot transplanted to America.  Another prominent Modernist, Wallace Stevens, was undisguised in his identification with Pierrot in his earliest poems and letters—an identification that he later complicated and refined through such avatars as Bowl (in Bowl, Cat and Broomstick [1917]), Carlos (in Carlos Among the Candles [1917]), and, most importantly, Crispin (in "The Comedian as the Letter C" [1923]).

As for fiction, William Faulkner began his career as a chronicler of Pierrot's amorous disappointments and existential anguish in such little-known works as his play The Marionettes (1920) and the verses of his Vision in Spring (1921), works that were an early and revealing declaration of the novelist's "fragmented state".  (Some critics have argued that Pierrot stands behind the semi-autobiographical Nick Adams of Faulkner's fellow-Nobel laureate Ernest Hemingway, and another contends that James Joyce's Stephen Dedalus, again an avatar of his own creator, also shares the same parentage.)

In music, historians of Modernism generally place Arnold Schoenberg's 1912 song-cycle Pierrot lunaire at the very pinnacle of High-Modernist achievement.  And in ballet, Igor Stravinsky's Petrushka (1911), in which the traditionally Pulcinella-like clown wears the heart of Pierrot, is often argued to have attained the same stature.

Students of Modernist painting and sculpture are familiar with Pierrot (in many different attitudes, from the ineffably sad to the ebulliently impudent) through the masterworks of his acolytes, including Pablo Picasso, Juan Gris, Georges Rouault, Salvador Dalí, Max Beckmann, August Macke, Paul Klee, Jacques Lipchitz—the list is very long (see Visual arts below).

As for the drama, Pierrot was a regular fixture in the plays of the Little Theatre Movement (Edna St. Vincent Millay's Aria da Capo [1920], Robert Emmons Rogers' Behind a Watteau Picture [1918], Blanche Jennings Thompson's The Dream Maker [1922]), which nourished the careers of such important Modernists as Eugene O'Neill, Susan Glaspell, and others.

In film, a beloved early comic hero was the Little Tramp of Charlie Chaplin, who conceived the character, in Chaplin's words, as "a sort of Pierrot".

As the diverse incarnations of the nineteenth-century Pierrot would predict, the hallmarks of the Modernist Pierrot are his ambiguity and complexity.

One of his earliest appearances was in Alexander Blok's The Puppet Show (1906), called by one theater-historian "the greatest example of the harlequinade in Russia". Vsevolod Meyerhold, who both directed the first production and took on the role, dramatically emphasized the multifacetedness of the character: according to one spectator, Meyerhold's Pierrot was "nothing like those familiar, falsely sugary, whining Pierrots.  Everything about him is sharply angular; in a hushed voice he whispers strange words of sadness; somehow he contrives to be caustic, heart-rending, gentle: all these things yet at the same time impudent."

Pierrot lunaire

The fifty poems that were published by Albert Giraud (born Emile Albert Kayenbergh) as Pierrot lunaire: Rondels bergamasques in 1884 were set to music several times. The best known version is by Arnold Schoenberg, i.e., his Opus 21: Dreimal sieben Gedichte aus Albert Girauds Pierrot lunaire (Thrice-Seven Poems from Albert Giraud's Pierrot lunaire—Schoenberg was numerologically superstitious). This led, among other things, to ensemble groups' appropriating Pierrot's name, such as the English Pierrot Players (1967–70). The Pierrot behind those cycles has invaded worlds well beyond those of composers, singers, and ensemble-performers. Theatrical groups such as the Opera Quotannis have brought Pierrot's Passion to the dramatic stage; dancers such as Glen Tetley have choreographed it; poets such as Wayne Koestenbaum have derived original inspiration from it. It has been translated into still more distant media by painters, such as Paul Klee; fiction-writers, such as Helen Stevenson; filmmakers, such as Bruce LaBruce; and graphic-novelists, such as Antoine Dodé. A passionately sinister Pierrot Lunaire has even shadowed DC Comics' Batman. Pierrot is aptly honored in the title of a song by the British rock-group The Soft Machine: "Thank You Pierrot Lunaire" (1969).

Carnivals
Pierrot appears among the revelers at various international carnivals. His name suggests kinship with the Pierrot Grenade of Trinidad and Tobago Carnival, but the latter seems to have no connection with the French clown.

Notes

References

Brinkmann, Reinhold (1997). "The fool as paradigm: Schoenberg's Pierrot Lunaire and the modern artist." In 

Campardon, Emile (1877). Les spectacles de la Foire ...: documents inédits recueillis aux archives nationales. 2 vols. Paris: Berger-Levrault et Cie.  Vol. I at Archive.org.  Vol. II at Gallica Books.
Campardon, Emile (1880). Les Comédiens du Roi de la Troupe Italienne pendant les deux derniers siècles: documents inédits recueillis aux archives nationales. 2 vols. Paris: Berger-Levrault et Cie. Vols.  I and II at Archive.org.

Champfleury (Jules-François-Félix Husson, called Fleury, called) (1859). Souvenirs des Funambules. Paris: Lévy Frères.

Dick, Daniella (2013).  "'Marked you that?': Stephen Dedalus, Pierrot".  In 

Fournier, Edouard (1885).  Etudes sur la vie et les oeuvres de Molière ....  Paris: Laplace, Sanchez et Cie.
Gautier, Théophile (1858–1859). Histoire de l'art dramatique en France depuis vingt-cinq ans. 6 vols. Paris: Edition Hetzel.
Gherardi, Evaristo, ed. (1721). Le Théâtre Italien de Gherardi ou le Recueil général de toutes les comédies et scènes françoises jouées par les Comédiens Italiens du Roy ... 6 vols. Amsterdam: Michel Charles le Cene.  Vols. I, II, III, IV, V, and VI at Google Books.

Gueullette, T.-S. (1938). Notes et souvenirs sur le Théâtre-Italien au XVIIIe siècle. Pub. J.-E. Gueullette. Paris: E. Droz.

Janin, Jules (1881). Deburau, histoire du Théâtre à Quatre Sous pour faire suite à l'histoire du Théâtre-Français. 1832. Rpt. in 1 vol, Paris: Librairie des Bibliophiles.

Lesage, Alain-René, and Dorneval (1724–1737). Le Théâtre de la Foire ou l'Opéra-Comique, contenant les meilleures pièces qui ont été représentées aux Foires de S. Germain & de S. Laurent. 10 vols. Paris: Pierre Gandouin.

Marsh, Roger (2007a). "'A multicoloured alphabet': rediscovering Albert Giraud's Pierrot Lunaire". Twentieth-Century Music. 4 (1: March): 97–121.
Marsh, Roger (2007b). "The translations." In booklet accompanying CDs: Roger Marsh—Albert Giraud's Pierrot lunaire, fifty rondels bergamasques. With The Hilliard Ensemble, Red Byrd, Juice, Ebor Singers & Paul Gameson director, Linda Hirst, Joe Marsh narrator. NMC Recordings: Cat. No. NMC D127.

Merrill, Stuart, tr. (1890). Pastels in prose. Introduction by William Dean Howells. New York: Harper & Brothers.

Millay, Edna St. Vincent (1921).  Aria da Capo.  New York: Mitchell Kennerley.

Muddiman, Bernard (1921).  The men of the nineties.  New York: G. P. Putnam's Sons.

Nouveau Théâtre Italien (Le) ou Recueil général des comédies représentées par les Comédiens Italiens ordinaries du Roi (1753). 10 vols. Paris: Briasson.
Nye, Edward (2014): "Jean-Gaspard Deburau: romantic Pierrot".  New theatre quarterly, 30:2 (May): 107-119.
Nye, Edward (2015-2016): "The romantic myth of Jean-Gaspard Deburau".  Nineteenth-century French studies, 44: 1 & 2 (Fall-Winter): 46-64.
Nye, Edward (2016): "The pantomime repertoire of the Théâtre des Funambules," Nineteenth century theatre and film, 43: 1 (May): 3-20.

Pandolfi, Vito (1957–1969). La Commedia dell'Arte, storia e testo. 6 vols. Florence: Sansoni Antiquariato.
Parfaict, François and Claude, and Godin d'Abguerbe (1767). Dictionnaire des théâtres de Paris ...   Vol. 3. Paris: Rozet.
Péricaud, Louis (1897). Le Théâtre des Funambules, ses mimes, ses acteurs et ses pantomimes ... Paris: Sapin.

Piron, Alexis (1928–1931). Œuvres complètes illustrées. Pub. Pierre Dufay. 10 vols. Paris: F. Guillot.

Rolfe, Bari (1978).  "Magic century of French mime".  Mime, mask & marionette: a quarterly journal of performing arts. 1 (3: fall): 135-58.

Salerno, Henry F., tr. (1967). Scenarios of the Commedia dell'Arte: Flaminio Scala's Il teatro delle favole rappresentative. New York: New York University Press.
Sand, Maurice (Jean-François-Maurice-Arnauld, Baron Dudevant, called) (1915). The history of the harlequinade [orig. Masques et bouffons. 2 vols. Paris: Michel Lévy Frères, 1860]. Philadelphia: Lippincott.

 

Séverin (Séverin Cafferra, called) (1929). L'Homme Blanc: souvenirs d'un Pierrot. Introduction et notes par Gustave Fréjaville. Paris: Plon.

Švehla, Jaroslav (1977). "Jean Gaspard Deburau: the immortal Pierrot." Tr. Paul Wilson. Mime Journal: 5. (This journal-length article is a translated condensation of Švehla's book-length study Deburau, nieśmiertelny Pierrot [Prague: Melantrich, 1976].)
Symons, Arthur (1919).  The Symbolist Movement in literature.  Revised and enlarged edition.  New York: E.P. Dutton & Company.

Further reading

Goby, Emile, ed. (1889).  Pantomimes de Gaspard et Ch. Deburau.  Paris: Dentu.
Hugounet, Paul (1889). Mimes et Pierrots: notes et documents inédits pour servir à l'histoire de la pantomime. Paris: Fischbacher.

Larcher, Félix and Eugène, eds. (1887).  Pantomimes de Paul Legrand.  Paris: Librairie Théàtrale.
Lee, Siu Hei (2018). The music and social politics of Pierrot, 1884-1915. Unpub. Ph.D. diss., University of California, San Diego.
Norman, Ana (2021).  Miming modernity: representations of Pierrot in fin-de-siècle France. Unpub. Master's thesis, Southern Methodist University.
 (Analyzes Pierrots of Arnold Schoenberg and Paul Margueritte in light of late-19th-century notions of "hysteria.")
Sentenac, Paul. (1923). Pierrot et les artistes: mémoires de l'Ami Pierrot. Paris: Sansot, Chiberre.

External links

Driant, Pénélope (2012). Maurice Farina, mime, archiviste et collectionneur (1883-1943). Unpub. Master's thesis.
Kreuiter, Allison Dorothy. (2007). Morphing moonlight: gender, masks and carnival mayhem. The figure of Pierrot in Giraud, Ensor, Dowson and Beardsley. Unpub. doc. diss., University of the Free State.
Levillain, Adele Dowling (1945).  The evolution of pantomime in France.  Unpub. Master's thesis, Boston University.
Toepfer, Karl (2019).  Pantomime: the history and metamorphosis of a theatrical ideology.

Zanni class characters
Clever Zanni class characters
Commedia dell'arte male characters
Mime
French clowns
Fictional French people
Fictional characters introduced in the 17th century